Various numbers play a significant role in Jewish texts or practice. Some such numbers were used as mnemonics to help remember concepts, while other numbers were considered to have intrinsic significance or allusive meaning. 

The song Echad Mi Yodea ("who knows one?"), sung at the Passover Seder, is known for recounting a religious concept or practice associated with each of the first 13 numbers.

In Jewish mysticism
In Jewish mystical study, numbers were believed to be a means for understanding the divine. This marriage between the symbolic and the physical found its pinnacle in the creation of the Tabernacle. The numerical dimensions of the temple are a "microcosm of creation ... that God used to create the Olamot-Universes."

1
One is our God, in heaven and on earth - אחד אלוהינו שבשמיים ובארץ

2
Two are the tablets of the covenant - שני לוחות הברית
There are two inclinations - good (yetzer hatov) and bad (yetzer hara)

3
Three are the Fathers (Patriarchs	- שלושה אבות (Abraham, Isaac and Jacob)
The three sons of Noah (Ham, Shem and Japheth)
Number of aliyot on a non-Yom Tov Monday and Thursday Torah reading and number of aliyot in Shabbat Mincha
The Holy of Holies occupied one-third of the area of the Temple (and previously, Tabernacle)
The angels declared that God was "Holy, holy, holy" for a total of three times
The Priestly Blessing contains three sections
On the third day the Jewish people received the torah

4
Four are the Mothers (Matriarchs) - ארבע אימהות (Sarah, Rebecca, Rachel, and Leah)
The number of aliyot on Rosh Chodesh
At the Passover Seder four cups of wine are drunk, and four expressions of redemption are recited
Both the heavens and earth were described as having four sides or corners, similar to the cardinal directions.

5
Five are the books of the Torah - חמישה חומשי תורה
Of the Ten Commandments, five were written on each of the two tablets.
The sections of the book of Psalms
The number of knots in the tzitzit
Number of aliyot on Yom Tov that does not coincide with Shabbat
Five species of grain

6
Six are the books of the Mishnah - שישה סידרי משנה
The six working days of the week
The six days of Creation

7
 According to a midrash, "All sevens are beloved": There are seven terms for the heavens and seven terms for the earth; Enoch was the seventh generation from Adam; Moses was the seventh generation from Abraham; David was the seventh son in his family; Asa (who called out to God) was the seventh generation of Israelite kings; the seventh day (Shabbat), month (Tishrei), year (shmita) and shmita (jubilee) all have special religious status.
The Seven Laws of Noah
The counting of the Omer consists of seven weeks, each of seven days
Number of blessings in the Sheva Brachot
A woman in niddah following menstruation must count seven "clean days" prior to immersion in the mikvah
Acts of atonement and purification were accompanied by a sevenfold sprinkling
The menorah in the Temple had seven lamps
The shiva mourning period is seven days
Number of days of Sukkot and Pesach (Israel)
Number of blessings in the Amidah of Shabbat, Yom Tov, and all Musaf prayers (except Rosh Hashanah)
Number of aliyot on Shabbat
There were seven of every pure animal in Noah's Ark
The number seven is said to symbolize completion, association with God, or the covenant of holiness and sanctification
Moses died on the seventh of Adar

8
Eight are the days of the circumcision	- שמונה ימי מילה
Total number of days of Yom Tov in a year in Israel
Number of days of Chanukah
 8 days of sukkos
Number of days of Pesach (Diaspora)
According to the Zohar, the number eight signifies new beginnings because the eighth day was the first day after creation when God returned to work; the week began again.

10
 The tenth letter of the Hebrew alphabet is the yud (yodh) and linked to the tetragrammaton (YHWH) and to Jews as YHW-dim
 The Ten Commandments
 The ten Plagues of Egypt
 Ten Jewish people form a minyan 
 There are ten Sefirot (human and Godly characteristics) depicted in Kabbalah
 According to the Mishna, the world was created by ten divine utterances; ten generations passed between Adam and Noah and between Noah and Abraham; Abraham received ten trials from God; the Israelites received ten trials in the desert; there were ten plagues in Egypt; ten miracles occurred in the Temple; ten apparently supernatural phenomena were created during twilight in the sixth day of creation. The number ten in this Mishna indicates a large number (e.g. the Mishna declares that Abraham's willingness to undergo ten trials "indicates his love for God").

11
Eleven are the stars of the Joseph's dream - אחד עשר כוכביא

12
Twelve are the tribes of Israel - שנים עשר שיבטיא
Ritual items frequently came in twelves to represent the role of each tribe. The high priest's breastplate (hoshen) had twelve precious stones embedded within them, representing the 12 tribes. Elijah built his altar with 12 stones to represent the tribes, Moses built 12 pillars at Sinai representing the tribes, and Joshua erected twelve memorial stones at the Jordan River representing the tribes.
 "All of God's creations are equal in number to the 12 tribes: 12 astrological signs, 12 months, 12 hours of the day, 12 hours of the night, 12 stones that Aaron [the high priest] would wear."
The Temple Mount could be accessed through twelve gates
Twelve is the age at which a Jewish female becomes bat Mitzvah and is obligated to follow Jewish law (Orthodox tradition)
There were twelve loaves of show-bread on the shulchan (table) in the Beit Hamikdash
Sons of Jacob
Number of springs of water Elim

13
Thirteen are the attributes of Hashem - שלושה עשר מידיא
13 is the numerical value of the word אחד (one) - to be understood as oneness and unity of creation
13 is the age at which a Jewish male becomes obligated to follow Jewish law, the age at which a Bar Mitzvah is attained
Thirteen Attributes of Mercy
Jewish principles of faith according to Maimonides
Number of days of Yom Tov in a year (Diaspora)
Months in a leap year on the Hebrew calendar

14
The number of steps in the Passover Seder
The number of books in the Mishnah Torah, also entitled Yad Hahazaka in which the word Yad has gematria 14

15
One of two numbers that is written differently from the conventions of writing numbers in Hebrew in order to avoid writing the name of God. The other is 16.
 The number of words in the Priestly Blessing

16
One of two numbers that is written differently from the conventions of writing numbers in Hebrew in order to avoid writing the name of God. The other is 15.

18
Gematria of "chai", the Hebrew word for life. Multiples of this number are considered good luck and are often used in gift giving.
The Amidah is also known as "Shemoneh Esreh" ("Eighteen"), due to originally having 18 blessings, though a 19th blessing was later added

19
The number of years in a cycle of the Hebrew calendar, after which the date on the lunar calendar matches the date on the solar calendar
Blessings in the weekday Amidah

20
Minimum age to join the Israelite army
In halakhah, the death penalty was only carried out if the offender was at least 20 years old

22
The number of letters in the Hebrew alphabet
The number of the almond blossoms on the menorah

24
Total number of books in the Tanakh
twenty-four kohanic gifts
24,000 people that died in the plague that Pinchas stops
24,000 students of R Akiva that died
24 questions that Reish Lakish would ask Rabbi Yochanan
24 blessings recited in the Amidah on fast days

26
Gematria of the Tetragrammaton

30
The number of days in some months of the Hebrew calendar

36
The world is said to be sustained by the merit of 36 hidden righteous individuals It's the double of 18 - See above

40
The number of days the spies were in the land of Canaan
Years in the desert—a generation
Days and nights of rain during the flood that occurred at the time of Noah
Isaac's age at marriage to Rebecca
Esau's age at marriage to his first two wives
Number of days Jonah prophesies will pass before Nineveh is destroyed. (They repent)
A mikveh must contain at least 40 se'ah (volume measurement) of water
Number of years of the reign of David, Solomon, and the most righteous judges in the book of Judges
Number of lashes for one who transgresses a commandment
Number of days which the Torah was given
Number of weeks a person is formed in their mother's womb
Number of curses on Adam
Minimum age at which a man could join the Sanhedrin

42
Letters in one of God's Divine Names
42 cities that refugees (See Cities of Refuge) can go to when they kill accidentally
There were 42 journeys of the sons of Israel through the desert

50
The 50th year of the sabbatical cycle was the Jubilee year

54
 The Torah is divided into 54 weekly Torah portions

60
Is the "venerable / old age [of people]" as Rashi calls it in his comment on Leviticus 27:7

70
The 70 nations of the world (Generations of Noah)
Members of the Sanhedrin
Lifespan of King David
Years between the destruction of the first and construction of the Second Temple
Number of date-palms at Elim
Number of members of Jacob's family who descended to Egypt
Number of the Jewish elders led by Moshe

86
The gematria of Elohim (אלהים)

130 
The age of Jochebed when she gave birth to her youngest son Moses.
The 130 shekels of silver was offered during the dedication of the altar. Jochebed

248
Number of positive commandments
Number of limbs (איברים) in man's  body

314
The gematria of the Hebrew word שדי (Shadai) once name of the G-d

365 
Length of the solar calendar (which has significance in Judaism)
Number of prohibitive commandments
Number of arteries in the body

374
Total number of years the First Temple stood

613
The 613 commandments, the number of mitzvot in the Torah

318
• Amount of men Abraham took to battle against the 4 kings

• Gemmatria of Eliezer

400
• The amount of shekalim Abraham paid Ephron (Bereishit 23:15)

• The amount of men with Esav

• Years in Egypt

620
The total number of mitzvot, including those of Torah and Rabbinic origin.

See also
 Bible code, a purported set of secret messages encoded within the Torah.
 Biblical and Talmudic units of measurement
 Chronology of the Bible
 Gematria
 Hebrew calendar
 Hebrew numerals
 Jewish symbolism
 Notarikon, a method of deriving a word by using each of its initial letters.

Notes

References
 
 
 
 
 
 
Rashi, The Sapirstein edition (1999). Book of Shemos, Parashas Mishpatim. p.307. .

Numbers
Numbers
Judaism
Judaism